Edwin Duncan Sandys, Baron Duncan-Sandys  (24 January 1908 – 26 November 1987), was a British politician and minister in successive Conservative governments in the 1950s and 1960s. He was a son-in-law of Winston Churchill and played a key role in promoting European unity after World War II.

Early life
Sandys, born on 24 January 1908 at the Manor House, Sandford Orcas, Dorset, was the son of George John Sandys, a Conservative Member of Parliament (1910–1918), and Mildred Helen Cameron. Sandys' parents divorced in January 1921 when he was 12 years old. His mother married Frederick Hamilton Lister in October that year, becoming Mildred Helen Lister. He was educated at Eton College and Magdalen College, Oxford.

Early career 
He entered the diplomatic service in 1930, serving at the Foreign Office in London as well as at the embassy in Berlin.

He became Conservative Party Member of Parliament (MP) for Norwood in south London in a by-election in March 1935, at which he was opposed by an Independent Conservative candidate sponsored by Randolph Churchill.

In May 1935, he was in effect saying that Germany should have a predominant place in central Europe, so that Britain could be free to pursue her colonial interests without rival.

The Duncan Sandys case 
In 1937, Sandys was commissioned into the 51st (London) Anti-Aircraft Brigade, Royal Artillery, of the Territorial Army (TA). In 1938, he asked questions in the House of Commons on matters of national security that reflected his TA experience. He was subsequently approached by two unidentified men, presumably representing the secret services, and threatened with prosecution under section 6 of the Official Secrets Act 1920. Sandys reported the matter to the Committee of Privileges which held that the disclosures of Parliament were not subject to the legislation, though an MP could be disciplined by the House. The Official Secrets Act 1939 was enacted in reaction to this incident.

Wartime career
During the Second World War he fought with 51st (London) HAA Regiment in the Norwegian campaign and was wounded in action; this left him with a permanent limp.

His father-in-law gave him his first ministerial post as Financial Secretary to the War Office from 1941 to 1944 during the wartime coalition government. Sandys had been wartime Parliamentary Secretary to the Ministry of Supply.  W. A. Robotham who had been in the Ministry as "Chief Engineer of Tank Design" wrote that he was knowledgable on army matters. Robotham of Rolls-Royce who had headed development of the Meteor tank engine  in WWII was surprised and pleased when in 1963 Sandys said "I regard the adoption of the Meteor tank engine as the absolute turning-point in the history of British tank development", at the opening of a Rolls-Royce aero engine factory at East Kilbride (aero engines being Rolls-Royce's main business).

From 1944 to 1945 he served as Minister of Works for the remainder of the coalition and in the Churchill Caretaker Ministry. While a minister he was chairman of a War Cabinet Committee for defence against German flying bombs and rockets, on which he frequently clashed with the scientist and intelligence expert R. V. Jones. However, he lost his seat in the 1945 general election. He resigned his TA commission as a lieutenant-colonel the following year.

Co-founder of the European Movement 

Sandys played a key role in the creation of the European Movement. He established the United Europe Movement in Britain in 1947 following a speech of his father-in-law, Winston Churchill, in Zurich on 19 September 1946 when Churchill had called for the "European family" to be recreated and provided with "a structure under which it can dwell in peace, in safety and in freedom".

In 1947, Joseph Retinger, who had been instrumental in setting up the European League for Economic Cooperation in 1946, approached Sandys, then Honorary Secretary of the UEM, to discuss ways the League and the United Europe Movement might cooperate on questions relating to European integration. They decided to call a small conference of existing organisations working for European unity - the European League for Economic Cooperation, the United Europe Movement, the Nouvelles Equipes Internationales, the European Parliamentary Union, and the European Union of Federalists. This took place in Paris on 20 July 1947 where ELEC, the UEM, the EPU and the EUF agreed to establish the Committee for the Co-ordination of the International Movements for European Unity. The EPU did not however subsequently ratify its participation in the Committee but the Nouvelles Equipes Internationales agreed to join. In December 1947, the Committee was renamed the International Committee of the Movements for European Unity and Sandys was elected its Chairman and Retinger its Honorary Secretary. 

The Committee organised the Congress of Europe, held in The Hague from 7–11 May 1948 with 750 delegates from across Europe. Following the Congress, the International Committee was transformed into the European Movement.  

Sandys served as a member of the Consultative Assembly of the Council of Europe  from 1950 until 1951.

Post-war parliamentary career 
He was elected to parliament once again at the 1950 general election for Streatham and, when the Conservatives regained power in 1951, he was appointed Minister of Supply. For most of his time in that role, his private secretary was Jack Charles.  As Minister of Housing from 1954, he introduced the Clean Air Act and in 1955 introduced the green belts.

He was appointed Minister of Defence in 1957 and quickly produced the 1957 Defence White Paper that proposed a radical shift in the Royal Air Force by ending the use of fighter aircraft in favour of missile technology. Though later ministers reversed the policy, the lost orders and cuts in research were responsible for several British aircraft manufacturers going out of business. As Minister of Defence he saw the rationalisation (i.e., merger) of much of the British military aircraft and engine industry.

Sandys continued as a minister at the Commonwealth Relations Office, later combining it with the Colonies Office, until the Conservative government lost power in 1964. In this role he was responsible for granting several colonies their independence and was involved in managing the British response to several conflicts involving the armed forces of the newly independent countries of East Africa.

He remained in the shadow cabinet until 1966 when he was sacked by Edward Heath. He had strongly supported Ian Smith in the dispute over Rhodesia's Unilateral Declaration of Independence. He was not offered a post when the Conservatives won the 1970 general election, but instead served as leader of the United Kingdom delegation to the Council of Europe and Western European Union until 1972 when he announced his retirement. The next year he was made a Companion of Honour.

In 1974 he retired from parliament and was awarded a life peerage on 2 May. As the title of Baron Sandys was already held by another family, he followed the example of George Brown and incorporated his first name in the title Baron Duncan-Sandys of the City of Westminster. He was an active early member of the Conservative Monday Club.

Personal life 
In 1935, Duncan Sandys married Diana Churchill, daughter of the future prime minister Winston Churchill. They divorced in 1960.

In 1962, he married Marie-Claire (née Schmitt), who had been previously married to Robert Hudson, 2nd Viscount Hudson. The marriage lasted until Sandys' death.

It has long been speculated that he may have been the 'headless man' whose identity was concealed during the scandalous divorce trial of Margaret Campbell, Duchess of Argyll, in 1963.

Sandys died on 26 November 1987 at his home in London. He is buried in the churchyard of St Nicholas in Child Okeford, Dorset. His grave is marked by a horizontal white slab.

Children
From his first marriage, with Diana Churchill:
The Hon. Julian Sandys (19 September 1936 – 15 August 1997)
The Hon. Edwina Sandys (born 22 December 1938)
The Hon. Celia Sandys (born 18 May 1943). She married firstly Michael Kennedy and secondly Dennis Walters (divorced 1979).

From his second marriage, with Marie-Claire Schmitt:
 The Hon. Laura Sandys (born 5 June 1964). She was a Conservative Member of Parliament for South Thanet.

Interests
Among Sandys' other interests was historic architecture. He formed the Civic Trust in 1957 and was its President; the Royal Institution of British Architects made him an honorary Fellow in 1968, and the Royal Town Planning Institute made him an honorary member. He was also a trustee of the World Security Trust.

Between 1969 and 1984 he was President of Europa Nostra and acted for the preservation of the European cultural and architectural heritage.

His business activities included a Directorship of the Ashanti Goldfields Corporation, which was later part of Lonrho of which he became chairman. He was therefore caught up in the scandal in which Lonrho was revealed to have bribed several African countries and broken international sanctions against Rhodesia, as well as the "unpleasant and unacceptable face of capitalism" episode involving eight directors being sacked by Tiny Rowland.

Career summary
 Coalition Government
 20 July 1941 – 7 February 1943, Financial Secretary to the War Office
 7 February 1943 – 21 November 1944, Parliamentary Secretary, Ministry of Supply
 21 November 1944 – 25 May 1945, Minister of Works
 Caretaker Government
 25 May 1945 – 26 July 1945, Minister of Works
 Conservative Government
 31 October 1951 – 18 October 1954, Minister of Supply
 18 October 1954 – 13 January 1957, Minister of Housing and Local Government
 13 January 1957 – 14 October 1959, Minister of Defence
 14 October 1959 – 27 July 1960, Minister of Aviation
 27 July 1960 – 13 July 1962, Secretary of State for Commonwealth Relations
 13 July 1962 – 16 October 1964, Secretary of State for the Colonies and Commonwealth Relations

Notes

Further reading
Cowling, Maurice, The Impact of Hitler – British Policies and Policy 1933–1940, Cambridge University Press, 1975, p. 415, .

External links

 
 men' in sex scandal finally named, The Guardian, 10 August 2000.
 Obituary, New York Times, 7 November 1987
 
The Papers of Lord Duncan-Sandys held at Churchill Archives Centre
British Army Officers 1939−1945

1908 births
1987 deaths
Alumni of Magdalen College, Oxford
British Army personnel of World War II
British Secretaries of State for Commonwealth Affairs
British Secretaries of State
Conservative Party (UK) MPs for English constituencies
Duncan-Sandys
European integration pioneers
Members of the Order of the Companions of Honour
Members of the Privy Council of the United Kingdom
Ministers in the Churchill caretaker government, 1945
Ministers in the Churchill wartime government, 1940–1945
Ministers in the Eden government, 1955–1957
Ministers in the Macmillan and Douglas-Home governments, 1957–1964
Ministers in the third Churchill government, 1951–1955
Ministers of Supply
People educated at Eton College
People educated at West Downs School
Royal Artillery officers
Secretaries of State for the Colonies
UK MPs 1935–1945
UK MPs 1950–1951
UK MPs 1951–1955
UK MPs 1955–1959
UK MPs 1959–1964
UK MPs 1964–1966
UK MPs 1966–1970
UK MPs 1970–1974
UK MPs who were granted peerages
Life peers created by Elizabeth II
Military personnel from Dorset
War Office personnel in World War II
Duncan